is a railway station located in the city of Izu, Shizuoka Prefecture, Japan operated by the private railroad company Izuhakone Railway.

Lines
Makinokō Station is served by the Sunzu Line, and is located 18.6 kilometers from the starting point of the line at Mishima Station.

Station layout
The station has two opposed side platforms connected to the station building by a level crossing. The station building is unattended and has automatic ticket machines.

Platforms

History 

Passenger statistics
In fiscal 2017, the station was used by an average of 228 passengers daily (boarding passengers only).

Surrounding area
 Kano River

See also
 List of Railway Stations in Japan

References

External links

 Official home page

Railway stations in Japan opened in 1924
Railway stations in Shizuoka Prefecture
Izuhakone Sunzu Line
Izu, Shizuoka